The 1992 CONCACAF Pre-Olympic Tournament was the eighth edition of the CONCACAF Pre-Olympic Tournament, the quadrennial, international, age-restricted football tournament organised by CONCACAF to determine which men's under-23 national teams from the North, Central America and Caribbean region qualify for the Olympic football tournament.

The winners, United States, qualified for the 1992 Summer Olympics together with runners-up Mexico as CONCACAF representatives.

Qualification

Qualified teams
The following teams qualified for the final tournament.

1 Only final tournament.

Final round

Qualified teams for Summer Olympics
The following two teams from CONCACAF qualified for the 1992 Summer Olympics.

1 Bold indicates champions for that year. Italic indicates hosts for that year.

References

External links
 RSSSF.com – Games of the XXVI. Olympiad | Football Qualifying Tournament

CONCACAF Men's Olympic Qualifying Tournament
1996
Oly
Football qualification for the 1992 Summer Olympics